Beitucheng Station is an interchange station on Line 8 and Line 10 of the Beijing Subway. Beitucheng is a very important station for people who want to get to the Olympic Park and Huilongguan area.

Station layout 
Both the line 8 and line 10 stations have underground island platforms. The line 8 platforms are located a level below the line 10 platforms.

Exits 
There are 6 exits, lettered A, B, C, D, E, and F. Exits A and C are accessible.

Gallery

External links

Beijing Subway stations in Chaoyang District
Railway stations in China opened in 2008